Cornelius Green (born January 21, 1954) is a former American football quarterback who played college football for the Ohio State Buckeyes. He was the first African American quarterback to start at Ohio State.

Early years
Green attended Dunbar High School where he practiced football, basketball and baseball. He was an option quarterback that also played defense.

He accepted a football scholarship from Ohio State University to play under head coach Woody Hayes. As a sophomore, he was named the starter at quarterback over Greg Hare. He was named Big Ten Conference MVP for the 1975 season, when his teammate Archie Griffin became the first two-time Heisman Trophy winner.

Green compiled a 31–2–1 record in the regular season, played in four Rose Bowls, three as the starting quarterback, won the 1974 Rose Bowl against USC, won three Big Ten championships, and led the 1973 team to an undefeated season.  In recognition of his Rose Bowl accomplishments, Greene was honored with induction into the Rose Bowl Hall of Fame in 2019.

Although his teams were based on run-oriented offenses, he still held the record of most career passing yards in school history for many years. He finished with 138-of-251 (55.0 percent) attempts for 2,255 yards and 17 touchdowns, while having 409 carries for 2,014 yards (4.9 YPC) and 28 touchdowns.

In 1998, he was inducted into the Ohio State Athletics Hall of Fame.

Professional career
Green was selected by the Dallas Cowboys in the eleventh round (318th overall) of the 1976 NFL draft to play him at wide receiver. He was waived on August 23, 1976. He was claimed off waivers by the Seattle Seahawks the next day. He was waived again before the start of the regular season on September 7. Greene joined the BC Lions of the Canadian Football League in October for a five-day tryout, but did not sign a contract. He signed a contract with the Lions after the season in March 1977. He was released before the start of the regular season in June. He signed with the Columbus Stingers of the Midwest Football League the next month. He played with the Columbus Metros in the league in 1978. The Metros joined the Mid-Atlantic Football League in 1979, and he played wide receiver for Columbus.

Personal life
In 1982, he moved back to his hometown of Washington, D.C., to work for the city and to manage a recreation center. He is a faculty member and multi-sport coach at St. Albans High School.

References

External links
Greene made color irrelevant

1954 births
Living people
Players of American football from Washington, D.C.
Place of birth missing (living people)
American football quarterbacks
BC Lions players
Ohio State Buckeyes football players
African-American players of American football
African-American players of Canadian football
Dunbar High School (Washington, D.C.) alumni
Dallas Cowboys players
Seattle Seahawks players
Midwest Football League (1962–1978) players
21st-century African-American people
20th-century African-American sportspeople